Fordham Road station was a light rail stop on the MBTA Green Line B branch, located in the median of Commonwealth Avenue at Fordham Road in Allston, Boston, Massachusetts. The stop had two side platforms, each located before the pedestrian crossing at Fordham Road. It was closed in 2004 as part of an effort to speed up travel times on the line.

History

In 2003, Fordham Road was one of five stops on the B branch proposed for closure to speed up travel on the line. The stops were chosen for their low average daily ridership and proximity to stops with higher ridership. Chiswick Road was dropped from the proposal shortly after it was announced, but the other four stops - Fordham Road, Summit Avenue, Mount Hood Road, and Greycliff Road -  were provisionally closed on April 20, 2004. On March 15, 2005, after a survey showed that 73% of 1,142 riders surveyed approved of the closures, the MBTA board voted to make the closures permanent.

References

External links

MBTA - Fordham Road (2003)

Green Line (MBTA) stations
Railway stations closed in 2004
Former MBTA stations in Massachusetts